Sylvia Muehlberg (born 31 July 1947) is an Australian sports shooter. She competed in two events at the 1984 Summer Olympics.

References

1947 births
Living people
Australian female sport shooters
Olympic shooters of Australia
Shooters at the 1984 Summer Olympics
Place of birth missing (living people)
20th-century Australian women
21st-century Australian women